Metsä Wood (formerly 'Finnforest') is part of Metsä Group, which covers the whole wood value chain. Metsä Wood mainly provides  engineered wood products for construction, industrial and distribution customers. Metsä Wood's primary products are Kerto® LVL (laminated veneer lumber) and birch and spruce plywood.

Headquartered in Espoo, the company employs about 1,600 people.

Production Units 

 Lohja, Finland: Kerto LVL
 Punkaharju, Finland: plywood and Kerto LVL
 Suolahti, Finland: plywood
 Äänekoski, Finland: veneer
 Pärnu, Estonia: plywood
 King’s Lynn, United Kingdom: timber upgrades
 Boston, United Kingdom: timber upgrades
 Widnes, United Kingdom: timber upgrades

References

External links 
 

Manufacturing companies based in Espoo
Forest products companies
Companies with year of establishment missing